Date and time notation in South Africa describes methods of expressing date and time used South Africa.

Date
South Africa signed up to use ISO 8601 for date and time representation through national standard ARP 010:1989 in 1998 A.D. The most recent South African Bureau of Standards standard SANS 8601:2009 "... is the identical implementation of ISO 8601:2004, and is adopted with the permission of the International Organization for Standardization" and was reviewed in 2016.

The week is from Sunday until Saturday. The first week of the year contains January 1, when there a new year begins.

English 
In English, the long date format is written in the day-month-year order and the short date format is written in the year-month-day order ( or ).

Afrikaans 
In Afrikaans, the long date format is written in the day-month-year order and the short date format is written in the year-month-day order.

Xhosa 
In Xhosa, the date is written in the year-month-day order (long format can't be displayed here due to the limitation with Template:Time;).

Zulu 
In the Zulu language, the date is written in the month-day-year order (long format can't be displayed here due to the limitation with Template:Time;).

Time
The 24-hour notation in hour-minute(s) order used a colon as a separator.

References

Time in South Africa
South Africa